Neurogenin-3 (NGN3) is a protein that in humans is encoded by the Neurog3 gene.

Neurogenin-3 is a pro-endocrine transcription factor that is a member of the basic helix-loop-helix (bHLH) transcription factor and has a primary function of activating gene transcription in endocrine progenitor cells. It is a master regulator of pancreatic islet differentiation and regeneration and functions to directly enhance the expression of the lineage-committed transcription factors required for the differentiation of the endocrine progenitor cells into each of the endocrine cell subtypes.

Expression 
Neurogenin3 is expressed in a small percentage of cells within the developing pancreas consisting of endocrine progenitor cells. It is expressed in the three stages of the development and differentiation of the endocrine pancreas. These stages are termed the

 First or primary transition stage which involves the specification and growth of a primitive stalk of primarily undifferentiated pancreatic epithelial cells, originating from two separate sites along the gut tube which later fuse to become a single organ.
 Second transition stage which is the period when the majority of endocrine cell differentiation occurs and the growing stalk of uncommitted pancreatic progenitors undergoes a branching morphogenesis and extensive endocrine and exocrine cytodifferentiation occurs and finally.
 Third transition stage where the individual differentiated endocrine cells (α,β,δ and PP cells) migrate away from the progenitor cell domain at the core of the developing pancreas and coalesce into islets of Langerhans().

The significance of NGN3 in endocrine cell development is shown by the fact that Neurog3 deficiency prevents the generation of all pancreatic and intestinal endocrine cells(). Ectopic overexpression of  Neurog3 leads to reduced endocrine mass as well, but by a mechanism that is different from that of  Neurog3 deficiency. Overexpression of  Neurog3 throughout the uncommitted pancreatic progenitor domain induces premature differentiation of the progenitor cell population into the endocrine lineage, effectively depleting the pool of multi-potent progenitor cells prior to their expansion resulting in a reduction in the overall mass of pancreatic endocrine tissue. These data point at a tight regulation of Neurog3 expression to maintain the proper size and cell composition of the endocrine pancreas.

Genetic mutations in Neurogenin3 have been often found to cause neonatal diabetes and the significance of neurogenin3 has also been further shown using invitro analysis where neurogenin3 was found to required for the development of mature human beta cells from pluripotent stem cells.

Role in pancreatic tissue development 
Neurogenin-3 is required for the development of endocrine pancreatic precursors for the four pancreatic endocrine cell types composed in the Islets of Langerhands: α-, β-, δ-, and pancreatic polypeptide (PP) cells, which produce the hormones glucagon, insulin, somatostatin, and PP respectively.

Neurogenin-3 producing cells are is located within or adjacent to the pancreatic ducts, which are thought to produce endocrine precursors.

In the absence of Neurogenin-3, expression of ISL1, PAX4, PAX6, and NeuroD are lost and endocrine precursors are lacking in the pancreatic epithelium. Neurogenin-3 absence also results in the absence of both insulin and glucagon detected normally at stages E15.5 and E9.5 in mouse embryos.

Tissues lacking Neurogenin-3 result in an abnormal exocrine tissue phenotype nearly identical to that of tissues with the loss of NeuroD expression. This phenotype is composed of abnormal cell polarity with nuclei having random positions and an abundant accumulation of Acinar Cells and Zymogen granules.

Transcription regulators for beta cell development 
Transcription factors control gene expression by interacting with enhancer sequences. The transcription factors pancreas/duodenum homeobox protein 1 (PDX1), Neurogenin-3 (NEUROG3), and V-maf musculoaponeurotic fibrosarcoma oncogene homolog A (MAFA) are required for beta cell growth and differentiation. NEUROG3 governs islet differentiation and restoration and is expressed in endocrine progenitor cells. PDX1 is required for the formation of exocrine and endocrine cells in the pancreas, especially beta cells. PDX1 also attaches to regulatory regions, causing insulin gene transcription to rise. Similarly, MAFA binds to the insulin gene's enhancer/promoter region and stimulates insulin production in response to glucose. PDX1, NEUROG3, and/or MAFA have been effectively used to convert numerous cell types into insulin-producing cells in vitro and in vivo, including pancreatic exocrine cells, hepatocytes, and pluripotent stem cells, in addition to their natural roles in beta cell formation and maturation. In this paper, we look at the biological features of PDX1, NEUROG3, and MAFA, as well as their applications and limitations in beta cell regeneration. A PubMed search for papers published between 1990 and 2017 was used to find the primary source literature for this review. Diabetes, insulin, trans-differentiation, stem cells, and regenerative medicine are all search phrases.

References